Q86 may refer to:
 Q86 (New York City bus)
 At-Tariq, a surah of the Quran